Kitab al Kanuz (Arabic: كتاب الكنوز), sometimes called The Book of Hidden Pearls, is a lost medieval Arabic manuscript from the 15th century. The manuscript is allegedly a treasure hunter's guide noted for its mention of the Zerzura oasis. The author and exact dating of the manuscript are unknown.

Content
The Kitab al Kanuz is a collection of mystical fables. It lists over four hundred sites in Egypt that hold hidden treasure, and details the incantations needed to ward off the evil spirits who guard the treasures. The guide provides a specific plan for obtaining the treasure without alerting the royalty, which includes retrieving the key from a unique location and using it to access the wealth. This approach allows the hunter to avoid any potential danger or complications that may arise from encountering the King and Queen directly.

The Egyptian Gazette, an English newspaper published in Cairo, printed a purported translation of a fragment of the manuscript relating to the Sphinx of Giza in 1904. They mistranslated the name, referring to it instead as the "Kitab el Kanoor". They stated that the manuscript was highly valued among Maghrebi treasure seekers, only a few copies existed and was at least a few centuries old. The translation went as follows:

"Go to the Sphinx and measure from its face south-east twelve Maliki cubits, that is to say, each a cubit and a half of the greatest cubit. Search there and you will find two mastabas of stone and stones scattered around them. Dig between the two mastabas about a man's height, and you will find a plate (? flagstone). Clear it from sand well, and raise it and pass to the door which is the door of the Great Pyramid. Cross the threshold of the door and beware of the wells on the right and left, which are closed wells. Pass straight on and take no notice of the wells, and you will find in the breast (front) of the wall a great stone (? turning). Open it and pass on, and you will see many cells on the right and left, and before your face a great cell with the (great) king of the former kings of Egypt, and kings with him and his son, around him, wearing their kingly robes adorned with gold and silver, and you will see their treasures and their emeralds, and pearls and ornaments of gold and silver...."

History 
E.A. Johnson Pasha, a member of the Royal Geographical Society, claimed in 1930 to have had the manuscript in his possession "for many years," and to have loaned it to the Department of Antiquities in 1905 or so. László Almásy of Hungary also read the manuscript and became enchanted by its Zerzura tale, which inspired him to help British explorers make expeditions into the Sahara desert for the Zerzura oasis in the 1930s.

It is unknown whether the Kitab al Kanuz still exists.

References

15th-century Arabic books
Arabic grimoires
Lost books